Mauritius is an island nation in the Indian Ocean about  off the southeast coast of the African continent. Since independence in 1968, Mauritius has developed from a low-income, agriculture-based economy to a middle-income diversified economy. The economy is based on tourism, textiles, sugar, and financial services. In recent years, information and communication technology, seafood, hospitality and property development, healthcare, renewable energy, and education and training have emerged as important sectors, attracting substantial investment from both local and foreign investors.

Notable firms 
This list includes notable companies with primary headquarters located in the country. The industry and sector follow the Industry Classification Benchmark taxonomy. Organizations which have ceased operations are included and noted as defunct.

See also 
 Stock Exchange of Mauritius in MUR
 Economy of Mauritius
Mascarene Islands
St Brandon
Cargados Carajos
Mauritius
Île Raphael
Avocaré Island
Permanent Grant
L'île du Sud
L'île du Gouvernement
999-year lease
Permanent Grant
L'Île Coco
Privy Council of the United Kingdom
 
 , Portuguese word meaning, among other things, "penis-shaped island"
 Casting (fishing)
 Fishing tournament
 Fly Casting Analyzer
Joan Wulff

References 

 
Mauritius